The Synod of Lakes and Prairies is a regional governing body of the Presbyterian Church (U.S.A.) (or PC(USA)). It consists of presbyteries located in Iowa, Minnesota, Nebraska, North Dakota, South Dakota, and Wisconsin, and one non-geographic presbytery. The Synod of Lakes and Prairies consists of 16 Presbyteries:,
 Presbytery of Central Nebraska 
 Dakota Presbytery
 Presbytery of Des Moines
 Presbytery of East Iowa
 Homestead Presbytery
 John Knox Presbytery
 Presbytery of Milwaukee 
 Presbytery of Minnesota Valleys
 Presbytery of Missouri River Valley
 Presbytery of North Central Iowa 
 Presbytery of the Northern Plains
 Presbytery of Northern Waters 
 Presbytery of Prospect Hill
 Presbytery of South Dakota
 Presbytery of the Twin Cities Area
 Winnebago Presbytery

References

Presbyterian Church (USA)